Nausicaa is a character in the Greek epic poem Odyssey.

Nausicaa or Nausikaa or Nausicaä, derived from the Greek name Nαυσικάα, may also refer to:

 Nausicaä (Nausicaä of the Valley of the Wind), the main character in Hayao Miyazaki's Nausicaä of the Valley of the Wind
 "Nausicaa" (Ulysses episode) an episode in James Joyce's novel Ulysses
 Nausicaá Centre National de la Mer (French National Sea Centre), an aquarium park near Boulogne-sur-Mer, France
 Nausicaa.net, a fan website about Studio Ghibli, Hayao Miyazaki, and related topics
 192 Nausikaa, an asteroid named after the Greek mythology character
 Nausicaa (Leighton), an 1878 painting by Frederic Leighton
 Nausicaa, a 1971 film by Agnès Varda
 Nausicaa, a 1961 opera by Peggy Glanville-Hicks
 The homeworld of the Nausicaans, a fictional race in Star Trek

Given name 

 Nausicaa Bonnín (born 1985), Spanish actress

See also 
 Nausicaä of the Valley of the Wind (disambiguation)